"Right Now" is a song by American singer Nick Jonas and German musician, DJ and record producer Robin Schulz. Written by Jonas and Skylar Grey, it was released by Island Records on August 24, 2018. Although this was Nick's last solo single before the Jonas Brothers reunited in 2019, he released the song "Spaceman" on February 25, 2021.

Background and release
On August 9 during an interview with Teen Vogue, Nick announced the song is one he had "been sitting on for awhile, but I was looking for the right time to put it out and the right person to collaborate with. [...] It's a song with Robin Schulz which I'm really excited about called "Right Now" that I wrote with Skylar Grey." The song was released on August 24. Upon the release of the song, several outlets speculated that the song was written about Jonas's wife Priyanka Chopra. On August 24, Skylar Grey took to her Instagram Stories to explain who inspired the song in further detail. She stated: "This song is about Elliot [her boyfriend]. Guys, Nick Jonas just put out a new song with Robin Schulz, and that's a song I worked on with him. And guess what? The song was inspired by my love [Elliot], cause I was always on these trips, going away and working, and on that one I was in London working with Nick, and something Elliot always used to say to me was "I swear, the next time I have you in my arms I'm never letting you go." And that's what inspired the song."

Critical reception
Kat Bein of Billboard said the song is a flirty dance-pop tune perfect for summer nights that reveal hidden excitement. A dancehall-inspired rhythm sets the scene for a folk-like melodic hook. Jonas gives a lovesick lean to his performance as he yearns for his lover to return from some far-off journey. It's a sultry club mood that lives up to the promise of the dark, red artwork.

Live performances
On September 7, 2018, Jonas and Schulz performed the song live on The Tonight Show Starring Jimmy Fallon.

Music video
On September 28, 2018 the music video of the song was released online. It shows Jonas singing the song in front of a black background.

Track listing
Digital download
 "Right Now" – 3:21

Digital download
 "Right Now " – 2:58

Personnel
Adapted from Tidal.

 Nick Jonas – composition
 Robin Schulz – composition, production
 Peter Hanna – composition
 Andrew McMahon – composition
 Taylor Bird – composition
 Skylar Grey – composition, backing vocals
 Steve Mac – composition, keyboard, production
 Junkx – composition, studio personnel, engineering, production
 Lindsey Stirling – composition

 Zane Carney – guitar
 John Paricelli – guitar
 Dann Pursey – guitar, studio personnel, engineering
 Juergen Dohr – keyboards
 Dennis Bierbrodt – keyboards
 Guido Kramer – keyboards, programming
 Chris Laws – drum programming, drums, studio personnel, engineering
 Eric Madrid – mixing, studio personnel
 William Binderup – studio personnel, assistant mixing

Charts

Weekly charts

Year-end charts

References

2018 singles
2018 songs
Interscope Records singles
Robin Schulz songs
Nick Jonas songs
Songs written by Skylar Grey
Songs written by Nick Jonas
Songs written by Andrew McMahon
Songs written by Steve Mac
Songs written by Robin Schulz
Songs written by Peter Hanna
Songs written by Taylor Bird (songwriter)
Song recordings produced by Steve Mac